Dubuque Regional Airport  is a regional airport located eight miles south of Dubuque, in Dubuque County, Iowa. On U.S. Highway 61, the airport is owned by the city of Dubuque and is operated as a department of the city government. The city council appoints people for four-year terms to the Airport Commission board, which oversees the airport. For day-to-day operations, the Commission hires an airport manager. DBQ is used for general aviation and sees one airline. A charter service is run by Sun Country Airlines. The airport offers maintenance and refueling services, including service for jets.

The National Plan of Integrated Airport Systems for 2017–2021 categorized it as a primary commercial service facility. Federal Aviation Administration records say the airport had 42,870 passenger boardings (enplanements) in calendar year 2008, 39,359 in 2009 and 33,861 in 2010.

History
The first airline flights at Dubuque were Mid-Continent DC-3s in 1950. In 1955 successor Braniff was replaced by Ozark, which pulled out its DC9s and FH227s in 1981.

Northwest Airlines announced on February 7, 2008, that its regional partner Mesaba Airlines (Northwest Airlink) would return to Dubuque with twice daily Saab 340s to Minneapolis-Saint Paul International Airport.  These flights began on June 20, 2008. On July 2, 2009, the merged Delta/Northwest Airlines announced it would end service to Dubuque, leaving DBQ with one airline.

The 2013 Federal sequester would have resulted in the closure of the airport's control tower, but the Federal Aviation Administration ultimately reversed its decision.

As late as early 2020, American Eagle ERJ-145s flew to O'Hare International Airport in Chicago three times a day, yet reduced their schedule to one daily flight due to the COVID-19 pandemic. As of September 6, 2022 American Eagle ended its last daily flight to the airport.

On November 3, 2022, Avelo Airlines and the Dubuque Regional Airport announced airline service to Orlando, Florida using Boeing 737-800 aircraft.

Facilities
Dubuque Regional Airport covers 1,240 acres (502 ha) at an elevation of 1,077 feet (328 m). It has two concrete runways: 18/36 is 6,327 by 150 feet (1,928 x 46 m) and 13/31 is 6,502 by 100 feet (1,982 x 30 m).

In the year ending September 30, 2017 the airport had 50,301 aircraft operations, average 138 per day: 96% general aviation, 4% air taxi, <1% military and <1% airline. In September 2017, 63 aircraft were based at the airport: 52 single-engine, 9 multi-engine,  2 jet and 1 helicopter.

The University of Dubuque has a flight operations center at the airport that provides for pilot training in the school's aviation programs.  This includes ground school and actual flight training. The university has two hangars for their aircraft and a third hangar that is shared.

The Experimental Aircraft Association (EAA) Chapter 327 is based at the airport. EAA Chapter 327 is a community organization that engages local pilots and the community in aviation related events. Pilots in this organization build aircraft under the experimental aircraft airworthiness certificate. EAA supports and sustains the observation area located on Aviation Drive just before the terminal.

The Key City Fliers is a flying club for local pilots to rent out single engine aircraft for personal enjoyment. The club's aircraft consist of a Piper Aircraft fleet. With the help of its members and volunteers in the club, the aircraft remain is great condition ensuring its users can have access to safe, maintained, and a low-cost option for flying.

The Robert L. Martin Terminal has free Wi-Fi internet access.  The airport recently installed enclosed walkways at the gates, allowing passengers to walk to the planes without going outdoors. The terminal has an ATM, vending machines, and gaming machines.  On June 22, 2018, the airport lost its restaurant (The Hangar Bar & Grille), due to American Airlines reducing its flights at the airport. The terminal has three gates for airline passengers and a jet bridge. The terminal has a baggage carousel, desks for three airlines, and rental car services including Avis and Hertz. During the COVID-19 Pandemic, a new restaurant (All Onboard by Life's a Feast) provides food service in the terminal area.

Airline and Destination

Passenger

The airport only has one scheduled flight.

Notes 

 Avelo Airlines flights to Orlando are temporarily operating from Cedar Rapids due to issues with TSA certification at Dubuque Regional Airport.

Safety
The airport has been recognized by the Federal Aviation Administration a number of times for its commitment to safety. It won the FAA's "Airport Safety Enhancement Award" in 1994, 1997, 2000, and 2003. In order to receive this honor, an airport must be free from discrepancies during an inspection for three consecutive years. In 2008, the Dubuque Regional Airport marked 18 consecutive years of perfect safety inspections in accordance with FAR Part 139. That record is unmatched among the approximately 600 certified U.S. airports.

Incidents and Accidents
 On December 24, 1982 Piper PA-31 Navajo N4091U crashed on a back course approach to Runway 13 due to low visibility. The pilot and passenger were killed.
 On April 19, 1993, a Mitsubishi MU-2B-60 N86SD, owned by the state of South Dakota, suffered a catastrophic failure of the propeller hub on its left engine and crashed, while on approach, south of the community of Zwingle, IA.  The crash killed all 8 on board including the governor of South Dakota, George S. Mickelson.
 On October 23, 2001 Beechcraft Baron 58 N7235R arriving from DuPage Airport crashed while on approach to Runway 31 due to ground fog.  One fatality occurred.
 On March 8, 2004 Cessna 172R N105FS stalled after ice accumulated on the wings, causing a hard impact on landing. Three minor injuries were reported.
 On April 3, 2011 AmericanConnection flight 5019 bound to O'Hare International Airport sustained substantial damage after the jet bridge was blown into the side of the plane. Winds were gusting to 27 kts, and the emergency brakes in the jet bridge failed to activate. There were no injuries, and the aircraft was repaired and returned to service.
 On October 13, 2014 Piper PA-46 N9126V crashed on approach to the airport. As of October 18, 2014 it is unclear why the plane crashed, though low visibility was reported. One fatality occurred.

Attempts at Expansion
To update facilities and accommodate growth, the City of Dubuque announced plans in 2007 to build a new, larger terminal building. The new $23 million facility is part of the airport's master improvement plan; it opened on June 9, 2016. On July 21,2020, Dubuque Regional Airport Commissioners voted unanimously to name the Dubuque Regional Airport Terminal Building after Captain Robert L. Martin.

While the city has expressed interest in courting more airlines, headwinds in the economy and airline staffing issues have hampered these efforts. Historically, Dubuque Regional had up to three air carriers. Two were eliminated following contractions in the airline industry related to the terrorist attacks on September 11, 2001. American Airlines said they would drop their flights in October 2018 due to financial difficulties and lower demand. In 2022, American Eagle announced its intensions to suspend its last flight offered to Dubuque, leaving the airport without scheduled commercial airline service. Local travelers need to travel to airports in neighboring cities such as Cedar Rapids, Madison, or the Quad Cities; the nearest major hub airport is Chicago O'Hare, which is a three-hour drive away.

See also
 Dubuque, Iowa
 List of airports in Iowa
 The Jule
 Dubuque station
 Dubuque Intermodal Transportation Center

References

External links
 Dubuque Regional Airport, official website
 Aerial image as of April 1994 from USGS The National Map
 
 
 https://www.ntsb.gov/investigations/AccidentReports/Reports/AAR9308.pdf

Airports in Iowa
Buildings and structures in Dubuque, Iowa
Transportation in Dubuque, Iowa
Transportation buildings and structures in Dubuque County, Iowa